Karadzhally may refer to:
Çardaqlı, Qubadli, Azerbaijan
Karadzhaly, Azerbaijan

See also 
Qaracallı (disambiguation)